Pekka Pennanen (24 February 1872 in Kesälahti – 18 July 1960 in Kesälahti) was a twentieth century Finnish politician.

He was a member of the National Coalition Party (Finland) and was the chairman of the party in 1936 - 1942 following the leadership of Paavo Virkkunen.

References
Pekka Pennanen Suomen kansanedustajat. Eduskunta

1872 births
1960 deaths
People from Kesälahti
People from Kuopio Province (Grand Duchy of Finland)
Finnish Lutherans
Young Finnish Party politicians
National Coalition Party politicians
Ministers of Agriculture of Finland
Members of the Diet of Finland
Members of the Parliament of Finland (1907–08)
Members of the Parliament of Finland (1908–09)
Members of the Parliament of Finland (1909–10)
Members of the Parliament of Finland (1910–11)
Members of the Parliament of Finland (1911–13)
Members of the Parliament of Finland (1913–16)
Members of the Parliament of Finland (1916–17)
Members of the Parliament of Finland (1917–19)
Members of the Parliament of Finland (1922–24)
Members of the Parliament of Finland (1924–27)
Members of the Parliament of Finland (1927–29)
Members of the Parliament of Finland (1929–30)
Members of the Parliament of Finland (1930–33)
Members of the Parliament of Finland (1933–36)
Members of the Parliament of Finland (1936–39)
Members of the Parliament of Finland (1939–45)
People of the Finnish Civil War (White side)
Finnish people of World War II